Meirisa Cindy Sahputri (born 29 May 1996) is an Indonesian badminton player affiliated with Suryanaga Surabaya club.

Achievements

BWF International Challenge/Series 
Women's doubles

  BWF International Challenge tournament
  BWF International Series tournament

Performance timeline

Individual competitions

Senior level

Women's doubles

Mixed doubles

References

External links 
 

1996 births
Living people
People from Sragen Regency
Sportspeople from Central Java
Indonesian female badminton players
21st-century Indonesian women
20th-century Indonesian women